The men's team cross country was a track and field athletics event held as part of the Athletics at the 1912 Summer Olympics programme. It was the first appearance of the event. The competition was held on Monday, July 15, 1912.

Forty-one runners from six nations competed. NOCs could enter up to 12 athletes.

Results

The first three runners for each nation to finish in the individual cross country race counted towards the team results.  Their placings were summed, and the team with the lowest sum won.  Of the 10 nations that sent cross country runners, 6 had at least 3 runners (Austria, France, Germany, and South Africa were the four that did not; they have only one runner each).  The United States had only 2 of its 5 runners finish, so did not make a valid team score.

References

 
 
 

Cross country team
1912